Subash Gajurel is a film director from Nepal. His film Basain was Nepal's Official Entry in 2006 for the 79th Academy Awards in the foreign-language film category.

Filmography
 Maya Baiguni - 2001
 Basain - 2005

References

External links
 

Nepalese film directors
Year of birth missing (living people)
Living people
Place of birth missing (living people)
21st-century Nepalese film directors